Sidney J. "Sid" Segalowitz is a Canadian psychologist and neuroscientist who is a professor of psychology at Brock University. He received his Ph.D. from Cornell University. He is known for his research using electroencephalography to study brain activity associated with human behavioral phenotypes.

References

External links
Faculty page

Academic staff of Brock University
Canadian psychologists
Canadian neuroscientists
Living people
Year of birth missing (living people)
Cornell University alumni